Karl Lott Rankin (September 4, 1898 – January 15, 1991) was an American diplomat from Wisconsin.

Background 
Rankin was born September 4, 1898, to Emmet and Alberta Rankin in Manitowoc, Wisconsin. He would serve in the United States Navy during World War I and attended college at the California Institute of Technology, the Federal Polytechnic Institute in Zurich, Switzerland; and Princeton University.

Diplomatic career
As an official for the United States Department of State, Rankin began his career as Assistant Trade Commissioner in Prague, Czechoslovakia from 1927 to 1929. Later, he would serve as Commercial Attache in Prague from 1929 to 1932, in Athens, Greece and Tirana, Albania from 1932 to 1939, in Brussels, Belgium and Luxembourg from 1939 to 1940, in Belgrade, Serbia and Yugoslavia from 1940 to 1941, and in Cairo, Egypt in 1944. While working as Commercial Attache in Belgrade in 1940, Rankin also served a U.S. Consul. From 1941 to 1942, Rankin was detailed to Manila, Philippines. Rankin returned to Athens in 1944, this time as Economic Officer, serving until 1946. He would hold the same position in Vienna, Austria from to 1946 to 1947, when he again returned to Athens as Counselor until 1949. That year Rankin was promoted to U.S. Consul General in Canton, China; and also became Consul General in Hong Kong from 1949 to 1950. Rankin was appointed U.S. Chargé d'Affaires to the Republic of China, based in Taipei, from 1950 to 1953, before being named Ambassador from 1953 to 1957. Finally, Rankin returned to Yugoslavia, serving as U.S. Ambassador from 1957 to 1961.

Personal life 
After his retirement from the diplomatic corps,  they made his home in South Bridgton, Maine. In 1964, he published a memoir, China Assignment. Pauline Rankin died in 1976 and he married Ruth Thompson Garcelon in 1978. Rankin died of prostate cancer on January 15, 1991, in Kennebunkport, Maine. He was a Congregationalist.

References

External links
Karl L. Rankin Papers at Seeley G. Mudd Manuscript Library, Princeton University

1898 births
1991 deaths
People from Manitowoc, Wisconsin
Military personnel from Wisconsin
Deaths from cancer in Maine
United States Navy personnel of World War I
Ambassadors of the United States to Yugoslavia
20th-century American diplomats
Deaths from prostate cancer
Ambassadors of the United States to Taiwan
Consuls general of the United States in Guangzhou
Consuls general of the United States in Hong Kong and Macau